Culture Palace of Abidjan (Palais de la Culture d'Abidjan) is a temple of culture in Abidjan, Ivory Coast (Côte d’Ivoire).

The building is situated between the Houphouët-Boigny Bridge and the General de Gaulle Bridge.

Culture Palace of Abidjan, with a capacity of 9,400 people, was bestowed to the Ivorian government as a gift from China. It was inaugurated on 1 October 1999 during the official handover of the keys.  It was constructed on a 12000 square meter site.

Conducted by Sidiki Bakaba since the year of 2000. Sidiki Bakaba, was honored for lifetime achievement on 10 July 2009, in the Pan-African Cultural Festival in Algiers.

Since 12 November 2002, the first Fokker F27 Friendship airplane of Ivory Coast, which has a 16-person capacity, is transformed into a library for children books and annex events.

Events 

 First edition of the competition "Chant'Ivoir 2011" from 1 May–21 June 2011
 Bonjour 2011, the sketch comedy show, 02/01/ 2011 
 13th Edition of the Festival of the African Cinema Cinema of Africa of Khouribga, 10 July 2010
 Highlight Edition 2010, the Ceremony of distinction the Best Artists of the Burida, 10 April 2010
 Concert "My shout of heart for Haiti", 7 March 2010 
 Conference on Native Americans, 22 December 2009

References

External links
 Official website of Culture Palace of Abidjan 
 An article about the plane-library on rezo-ivoire.net 

Ivorian culture
Museums in Ivory Coast
Buildings and structures in Abidjan
Cultural centers
1999 establishments in Ivory Coast